Heretaunga Tamatea is a Māori iwi of New Zealand. In a 2014 settlement with the government, Heretaunga Tamatea was described as a settling group, including:

Ngāi Tahu ki Takapau, Ngāi Tamaterā, Ngāi Te Ao, Ngāi Te Hauapu, Ngāi Te Hurihanga-i-te-rangi, Ngāi Te Kīkiri o te Rangi, Ngāi Te Oatua, Ngāi Te Rangikoianake I and II, Ngāi Te Rangitekahutia I and II, Ngāi Te Rangitotohu (also known as Rangitotohu), Ngāi Te Ūpokoiri, Ngāi Te Whatuiāpiti, Ngāi Toroiwaho, Ngāti Hāwea, Ngāti Hikatoa, Ngāti Hinemanu, Ngāti Hinemoa, Ngāti Hinetewai, Ngāti Hoata, Ngāti Honomokai, Ngāti Hōri, Ngāti Kautere, Ngāti Kere, Ngāti Kotahi, Ngāti Kurukuru, Ngāti Mārau o Kahungunu (also known as Ngāti Mārau], Ngāti Mahuika, Ngāti Manuhiri, Ngāti Mihiroa, Ngāti Ngarengare, Ngāti Papatuamāro, Ngāti Pīhere, Ngāti Pōporo, Ngāti Pukututu, Ngāti Rahunga, Ngāti Takaora ( Ngāti Takaro), Ngāti Tamatea, Ngāti Te Rehunga, Ngāti Toaharapaki, Ngāti Tukuaterangi (also known as Ngāti Tukua I te Rangi), Ngāti Tukuoterangi, or Ngāti Tuku(a)oterangi), Ngāti Ura ki te Rangi (also known as Ngāti Urakiterangi) and Ngāti Whakaiti.

See also
List of Māori iwi

References